Vitali Valeryevich Timofeyev (born 4 February 1982) is a former Russian professional footballer.

Club career
He made his debut in the Russian Premier League in 2004 for FC Khimki.

References

External links

1982 births
People from Novocherkassk
Living people
Russian footballers
Association football defenders
Russian Premier League players
Russian expatriate footballers
Expatriate footballers in Belarus
FC SKA Rostov-on-Don players
FC Rotor Volgograd players
FC Mordovia Saransk players
FC Baltika Kaliningrad players
FC Shakhtyor Soligorsk players
FC Luch Vladivostok players
FC Khimki players
FC Vityaz Podolsk players
FC Sokol Saratov players
FC Zenit-Izhevsk players
FC Nika Krasny Sulin players
FC Dynamo Makhachkala players
Sportspeople from Rostov Oblast